Bobby D. Singleton is an American politician who is currently a Democratic member of the Alabama Senate, representing the 24th District since a special election in January 2005. Previously he was a member of the Alabama House of Representatives from 2002 through 2005.

Singleton received a B.S. degree from Alabama State University and a J.D. from Miles Law School. He is a member of the Greenleaf Missionary Baptist Church in Greensboro. Singleton is the former chairman of the Alabama Legislative Black Caucus as well as Minority Whip of the Democratic caucus.

On July 1, 2010, Singleton was arrested for blocking the entrance to Greenetrack gambling hall in Eutaw, Alabama. He was blocking members of Alabama Governor Bob Riley's Task Force on Illegal Gambling from entering the facility; which was a violation of a state Supreme Court order to re-enter and re-secure the site. Fifteen others were arrested including Greenetrack's CEO.

References

External links
Alabama State Legislature: Senator Bobby Singleton - official government website
Project Vote Smart - Senator Bobby D. Singleton (AL) profile
Follow the Money - Bobby D. Singleton: 2006 2002 campaign contributions
Political profile at Bama Politics

21st-century African-American politicians
21st-century American politicians
African-American lawyers
African-American state legislators in Alabama
African-American businesspeople
American businesspeople
Alabama lawyers
Democratic Party Alabama state senators
Alabama State University alumni
Baptists from Alabama
Date of birth missing (living people)
Living people
Democratic Party members of the Alabama House of Representatives
Miles Law School alumni
People from Greensboro, Alabama
Year of birth missing (living people)